Selviria anneae is a species of dung beetles in the subfamily Aphodiinae. It is found in Brazil.

References

Further reading

 
 
 
 
 

Scarabaeidae
Beetles described in 2005